The Basque Center of Applied Mathematics (BCAM) is a research center on applied mathematics, created with the support of the Basque Government and the University of the Basque Country. The BCAM headquarters are in Alda. Mazarredo, 14  in Bilbao, the capital of the province  of Biscay in the Basque Country of northern Spain.

Background
In January 2007, the Department of Education, Universities and Research of the Basque Government  set up Ikerbasque, the Basque Foundation for Science, which was charged with three objectives: the attraction and recovery of front-rank, consolidated researchers; the creation of new research centers with standards of excellence, and social outreach for science. The creation and current activity of BCAM – the Basque Center for Applied Mathematics - fall within the framework of the second of these objectives.

In early 2008, Ikerbasque commissioned Enrique Zuazua to carry out a prospective study on the viability of setting up a center for mathematical research in the Basque Country. In March, 2008, the Ikerbasque Board of Trustees decided to go ahead with the creation of such a center as part of the BERC program (Basque Excellent Research Centres), later to become known as BCAM – Basque Center for Applied Mathematics. At the same time, the first international call for submissions for posts of director, managers and scientists was made.

The center is located in the province of Biscay, given the extensive industrial fabric that the region has had traditionally as well as its current development of R+D+i activities.
BCAM was officially created as a non-profit Association on September 1, 2008, and backed by the following three institutions: Ikerbasque, the University of the Basque Country (UPV-EHU), Innobasque, the Basque Foundation for Innovation and The Biscay Government.

Scientific Directors of BCAM till today 
 Jose Antonio Lozano - In charge since January 10, 2019 
 Luis Vega González - from May 8, 2013 till January 9, 2019.
 Tomás Chacón, from October 1, 2012 till March 10, 2013.
 Enrique Zuazua, from September 1, 2008 till July 31, 2012.

Research lines
The scientific program is structured in 5 research areas. These areas are intended to be the catalyst between basic research and technology transfer:

 Computational Mathematics (CM)
 Mathematical Modelling With Multidisciplinary Applications (M3A)
 Mathematical Physics (MP)
 Partial Differential Equations, Control And Numerics (DCN)
 Data Science and Artificial Intelligence (DS)

See also
Basque Government
Ikerbasque
Innobasque
University of the Basque Country

References

External links
 http://www.bcamath.org

Applied mathematics
Mathematical institutes
Research institutes in the Basque Country (autonomous community)